The ‘’’Panamuwa II inscription’’’ is a 9th-century BC stele of King Panamuwa II, from the Kingdom of Bit-Gabbari in Sam'al. It currently occupies a prominent position in the Vorderasiatisches Museum Berlin.

The 23 line inscription was discovered in 1888 during the 1888-1902 German Oriental Society expeditions led by Felix von Luschan and Robert Koldewey.

Similar to the Hadad Statue, the inscription is on the base of a pillar-shaped statue. It was written by Panamuwa II's son Bar Rakib in the Samalian language, considered to be on a dialect continuum between Phoenician and Aramaic. The inscription mentions Tiglath-Pileser III.

Text
The text of the inscription below is presented in George Albert Cooke's 1903 "Text-book of North-Semitic Inscriptions: Moabite, Hebrew, Phoenician, Aramaic, Nabataean, Palmyrene, Jewish".

References

Bibliography
 Halévy, J., "Procès-verbal de la séance générale du 26 juin 1891." JA ser. 8, vol. 18 (1891): 5–9.
 Sachau, E., "Zur historischen Geographie von Nordsyrien." SPAW 21 (1892): 313–38
 Belger, C., "Sendschirli II." Berliner philologische Wochenschrift 13 (1893): 355–56, 385-88
 Derenbourg, H., "Pînamou, fils de Karîl." REJ 26 (1893): 135–38
 Halévy, J., "Deux inscriptions sémitiques de Zindjîrlî." RevSém 1 (1893): 77–90
 Luschan, F. von, "Fünf Bildwerke aus Gerdschin."
 Müller, D.H., "Die altsemitischen Inschriften von Sendschirli." WZKM 7 (1893): 33–70, 113-40
 Šanda, A., "Zur Panammu-Inschrift Zeile 16." BZ 2 (1904): 369. Pan

9th-century BC steles
1888 archaeological discoveries
Ancient Near East steles
Aramaic inscriptions
KAI inscriptions